Business Casual is the third studio album by Canadian electro-funk duo Chromeo, released on September 14, 2010, by Last Gang Records and Turbo Recordings. The album is Chromeo's major-label debut, following the duo's signing to Atlantic Records. Upon its release, Business Casual was met with generally positive reviews from music critics. Four singles were released from the album: "Night by Night", "Don't Turn the Lights On", "Hot Mess", and "When the Night Falls".

Promotion
The album's lead single, "Night by Night", was released on September 22, 2009 as a free download through Green Label Sound, a Mountain Dew-sponsored record label. The Jérémie Rozan-directed music video, which was also funded by Mountain Dew, was filmed at a warehouse in Greenpoint, Brooklyn. Chromeo performed "Night by Night" on Late Show with David Letterman on September 20, 2010.

"Don't Turn the Lights On" was released on June 28, 2010, as the second single from Business Casual, and its music video was directed by Keith Schofield.

"Hot Mess" served as the album's third single. An alternative version of the song featuring Elly Jackson of La Roux was released in the United Kingdom on February 7, 2011, while the original version was released in the United States on February 15 and in Canada on March 1. The accompanying video, directed by Jérémie Rozan, was shot in Dumbo, Brooklyn. The duo performed "Hot Mess" on Conan on February 21, 2011.

"When the Night Falls" was released on July 25, 2011, as the album's fourth and final single. The song's video was directed by Daniels and features Solange Knowles, who also provides additional vocals for the track.

Critical reception

Business Casual received generally positive reviews from music critics. At Metacritic, which assigns a normalised rating out of 100 to reviews from mainstream publications, the album received an average of 68, based on 19 reviews, which indicates "generally favorable reviews". Simon Vozick-Levinson of Entertainment Weekly wrote that despite the duo's major-label deal, "[o]n Business Casual they remain adept students of the Hall & Oates school of hooks, which they surround with gleaming synth grooves and robotic talkbox solos that recall '80s funk masters like Zapp & Roger." Chris Martins of The A.V. Club stated that the album "opens with a powerful three-part salvo crafted for maximum dance-floor penetration. [...] But as the album progresses, an unexpected soulfulness emerges". Anupa Mistry of URB remarked, "The defining thread running through Chromeo's body of work is earnestness: you might scoff at the Lothario-obsession, the legs on display in the artwork, the almost-religious adherence to '80s stylistics, but in the end you either have to a) give it up for their studiousness, or b) just dance." Marc Hogan of Spin opined that Business Casuals "libidinous wit can't quite match 2007's Fancy Footwork, but this day at the office still features booty calls, romantic squabbles, and digitally syrupy declarations of devotion."

Slant Magazine's Jesse Cataldo found the album to be "transparent and tacky enough that its not becoming insufferable is a triumph in itself. Its earnestness, and the enthusiasm which it presents its reconstituted '80s sounds, is even lovable." AJ Ramirez of PopMatters felt that "Chromeo still won't win any points for originally  or distinctiveness", but noted, "For the majority of its runtime, Business Casual booms with the allure of a greatest hits collection, and actually stands as a more consistent work than the full-length efforts of many of Chromeo's influences." AllMusic's Jason Lymangrover commented that the album has "the typically synth-suave electro-funk jams [...] As the album progresses, though, [the duo] dig[s] deeper into crates for cheesy inspiration, and you can hear glimmers of Rockwell, Lionel Richie, Oran Juice, and even The Kids from Fame TV series." Pitchfork Larry Fitzmaurice suggested that the album's "most successful moments are the result of genre-related leg-stretching", adding that "the record is a unique situation, as it represents Chromeo's growth as master arrangers and producers, despite feeling like a step backwards in overall quality." Kevin Ritchie of Now concluded that "Business Casual has a few bangers, but over the course of an album, the synth soloing gets old fast. Still, while we wait for a pop saviour to take the genre forward, Chromeo provide a nice enough tribute to its past." In a review for NME, Mike Williams expressed that "Phillippe Zdar's production is a deluxe weave of dreamy synths, biting snares, throbbing bass and warbly Vocoders, but it feels as if Chromeo are just doodling knobs over the top."

Track listing

Personnel
Credits adapted from the liner notes of Business Casual.

Musicians
 Chromeo – all vocals, instruments 
 Kesh – additional vocals 
 Solange Knowles – additional vocals 
 Adrian Harpham – tom solos 
 Ezekiel Wexley – guitar 
 Tom Smith – saxophone 
 Larry Gold – string arrangements, string conducting

Technical
 Chromeo – production, recording ; additional recording ; executive production
 Jon Martinez – recording assistance
 Teruhisa Uchiyama – recording assistance
 Lawson White – recording ; additional recording 
 A-Trak – additional recording ; consigliere
 Jeff Chestek – additional recording 
 Rick Friedrich – additional recording assistance 
 Greg Smith – additional recording assistance 
 Zdar – mixing
 Julien Naudin – mixing assistance
 Simon Davey – mastering 
 Mike Marsh – mastering 
 Emily Lazar – mastering 
 Joe LaPorta – mastering 
 Tiga – executive production
 Kevin Kocher – project coordination
 Oliver Sasse – project coordination
 Adrien Fillon – additional co-production

Technical
 Jérémie Rozan – art direction
 Charlotte Delarue – art direction
 Harri Peccinotti – photography
 Adrien Blanchat – image manipulation
 Marjorie Van Hoegaerden – model

Charts

Release history

Notes

References

2010 albums
Big Beat Records (American record label) albums
Chromeo albums
Last Gang Records albums
Modular Recordings albums